The Koko River is a river in the Rusizi District of southwestern Rwanda that is a right-hand tributary of the Ruhwa River, which forms the boundary between the western regions of Rwanda and Burundi.  For most of its length it runs through the Nyungwe National Park.

References

Citations

Sources

Rivers of Rwanda